Ruth Mastenbroek is British perfumer who launched an eponymous range of fragrances in 2010.

Mastenbroek grew up in England and the United States, studied Chemistry at Lady Margaret Hall, Oxford University.  She trained classically as a perfumer in Grasse, France, before joining Quest (now part of Givaudan) in England, Holland, France and Japan/ She is also a former president of the British Society of Perfumers.

Mastenbroek has her own range of fragrances, with three currently in the collection (Signature, Amorosa and Oxford).

References

Perfumers
Alumni of Lady Margaret Hall, Oxford
Living people
Year of birth missing (living people)